Eupithecia defimbriata is a moth in the  family Geometridae. It is found in Brazil (Parana).

References

Moths described in 1906
defimbriata
Moths of South America